El Dorado High School is a 9th–12th grade public high school located in Placentia, California. Established in 1966, it is one of four high schools in the Placentia-Yorba Linda Unified School District and serves the northern parts of Placentia and Yorba Linda far eastern Fullerton, east of the 57 freeway, and a small portion of Brea. The EDHS campus is located at 1651 Valencia Avenue, approximately 29 miles from downtown Los Angeles and 18 miles from the California coastline.

The school currently has an enrollment of over 2,400 students. The school's first graduating class was the class of 1969. The campus received a major renovation in 2002. The EDHS gymnasium is dedicated to Joe Raya, a former Athletics department staff member. The theatre is dedicated to Mrs. Gai Jones, who directed the theatre department from 1967 to 2002.

In 2004, Athletic director Sally Reclusado was selected as the CIF Southern Section Athletic Director of the Year. Librarian Linda Birtler was awarded the Orange County Department of Education's Outstanding Contribution to Education Award. El Dorado has also won the prestigious Blue Ribbon Award.

The school is home to the El Dorado Golden Hawks Marching Band; the band's past achievements include a performance in the Sydney Olympics Opening Ceremony, the Tournament of Roses Parade and top honors in two trips to the Hawaii International Competition.

Marching band

El Dorado has an award-winning marching band, wind ensemble, symphonic band, winter drumline, colorguard, and three jazz ensembles.

The band has performed in Canada, Florida, Hawaii, and Nevada, as well as at the 2000 Sydney Olympics and 2005 and 2010 Tournament of Roses Parade. Also, the drumline and color guard performed in the opening ceremonies for the 2011 Tournament of Roses Parade. The Hawks have also performed for former President Ronald Reagan and former President George H. W. Bush.

During the 2007 marching season, El Dorado was undefeated in field tournament competition receiving sweepstakes awards at the Irvine Field Tournament, the Mira Mesa Field Tournament, the Vista Field Tournament, and the Arcadia Festival of Bands Field Tournament.

El Dorado's three jazz ensembles are also well known for their high-level musicianship and straight-ahead jazz style. The three bands have consistently received top honors at local and regional competitions. In Spring 2006, El Dorado's jazz ensemble 1 was distinguished as the "Outstanding Instrumental Ensemble" at the Reno International Jazz Festival .

Athletics

School teams have won various competitions as follows:

1975: the water polo team won the CIF SS (Southern Section) title in an exciting game played at East LA College. The Golden Hawks beat Indio High School 8–6.
2003: the roller hockey team won the NARCh Varsity cup to become the best high school team in the country by beating Santiago High School 5–4 in overtime.
2006: the football team won the CIF Southern Section Championship for the first time in school history by beating Charter Oak High School 17–6.
2007: the football team won the CIF Southwestern division championship by defeating Trabuco Hills High School 13–12.
2007: the wrestling team won the CIF Central Division Championship with 188 points, edging out Canyon Springs High School & Calvary Chapel High School of Santa Ana.
2008: the wrestling team won the CIF Central Division Championship with 186.5 points, edging out Millikan High School & Calvary Chapel High School of Santa Ana.
2010: the varsity cheer team won their first USA Spirit High School National Championship after finishing second in 2009.
2011: the varsity cheer team became the first California School in 23 years to win the UCA National Cheerleading Championships in Orlando Florida. Their performance was broadcast on ESPN and warranted a Foxnews LA feature upon their return. This team finished their second undefeated season and captured CIF, State as well as both the UCA and USA National Championships.
2017: the boys soccer program were crowned CIF Division 3 Champions and then followed it up by becoming CIF Division 3 SoCal State Regional Champions. After starting the season poorly, the team went 19 games unbeaten, winning 17 of those games and ending the season on a 10-game winning streak.

Principals
Howard Roop (1966–1969)
Marvin Stewart (1969–1973)
Jerry Jertberg (1973–1986)
Alvin Hawkins (1986–1988)
Richard Bernier (1988–1991)
Joann Ball (1991–1994)
Joe Quartucci (1994–1999)
Karen Wilkins (1999–2010)
Cary Johnson (2010–2012)
Carey Cecil  (2012–2015)
Joey Davis   (2016–present)

Notable alumni

Bret Boone – Major League Baseball player
Chris Buck – Oscar-winning director of Frozen
Michael Chang – Retired pro tennis player
Christie Clark – Actress, Days of Our Lives
John Crawford – Co-founded alternative rock group Berlin
Peter Daut – News anchor, KCBS-TV 
D-loc – Rapper Kottonmouth Kings and Kingspade
Chris Dressel – NFL tight end, Houston Oilers and New York Jets
Janet Evans – Olympic medal winning swimmer, and former world record holder
Jason Freese – Keyboard player of the band Green Day
Josh Freese – Drummer of the band Weezer and The Vandals
Till Kahrs – Recording Artist/Singer-Songwriter, Author, Communication Skills Expert
Dan Kennedy – Professional soccer player currently with Chivas USA
James Levesque – Bassist and founding member of Agent Orange
Matt Luke – Retired Major League Baseball player
Travis Miguel – Guitarist for the band Atreyu
Dylan Moore – Major League Baseball player 
Phil Nevin – Retired Major League Baseball player. Current Manager for the Los Angeles Angels of Anaheim
Kherington Payne – Dancer (Top 10 of So You Think You Can Dance season 4) and actress
Audrina Patridge – Actress, The Hills
Dan Petry – Retired Major League Baseball pitcher
Norm Rapmund – American comic book artist
Shawn Ray – Former professional bodybuilder
Steve Soto – Bassist for bands the Adolescents and also founding member of Agent Orange
Brett Tomko – Major League Baseball pitcher
Deborah Voigt – Soprano opera singer
Pete Woods – American comic book inker

References

External links
 
 EDHS Alumni
 El Dorado Band & Colorguard

High schools in Orange County, California
Placentia, California
Public high schools in California
1966 establishments in California
Educational institutions established in 1966